India–Slovakia relations are the bilateral ties between India and Slovakia. Both countries established relations in 1921 with a Czechoslovak consulate in Bombay. Modern relations began in 1993 after the dissolution of Czechoslovakia.

Slovakia has an embassy in New Delhi. It also has Honorary Consuls in Mumbai, Kolkata and Bangalore. India operates an embassy in Bratislava. Both nations are free from any bilateral problem, besides they cooperate well in international forums.

Exchanges and Trade relations

The former Czechoslovakia was one of the largest trading partners of India in Central Europe. Diplomatic relations between the Republic of India and the Slovak Republic have been established in 1993.  Under the trade agreement signed with Slovakia in 1993, a Joint  Committee  for  Economic  and  Commercial  Cooperation (ISJEC) was set up in May 1994. The 9th session of INJEC has been held in Bratislava in April 2017.  So far nine meetings have been held. The 9th Session of INJEC was held in Bratislava on 21 April 2017. Major items of India’s exports to Slovakia 
during 2009 to 2012 include textiles and clothing accessories, footwear, 
inorganic chemicals, yarns and related products, plastics and 
pharmaceuticals. Major items of import from Slovakia include iron and steel 
products, road vehicles, industrial machinery and parts thereof, organic 
chemicals, and pharmaceutical products (antibodies) etc. A Slovak company 
has also been supplying axles for TATRA trucks being assembled by Bharat 
Earth Movers Ltd (BEML)

References

Slovakia